AAMB may refer to: 

Purdue All-American Marching Band
Abu Ali Mustapha Brigades, the armed wing of the Popular Front for the Liberation of Palestine
al-Aqsa Martyrs' Brigades, extremist organisation, West Bank, Middle East